The 1962–63 season was Galatasaray's 59th in existence and the 5th consecutive season in the 1. Lig. This article shows statistics of the club's players in the season, and also lists all matches that the club have played in the season.

Squad statistics

Players in / out

In

Out

Milli Lig

Standings

Red group

Final league table

Matches
Kick-off listed in local time (EET)

Türkiye Kupası
Kick-off listed in local time (EET)

2nd round

3rd round

1/4 final

1/2 final

Final

European Cup

Preliminary round

2nd round

1/4 final

Friendly Matches

Attendances

References

 Tuncay, Bülent (2002). Galatasaray Tarihi. Yapı Kredi Yayınları

External links
 Galatasaray Sports Club Official Website 
 Turkish Football Federation – Galatasaray A.Ş. 
 uefa.com – Galatasaray AŞ

Galatasaray S.K. (football) seasons
Turkish football clubs 1962–63 season
Turkish football championship-winning seasons
1960s in Istanbul